Phytophthora polonica is a non-papillate homothallic plant pathogen known to infect alder species.

References

Further reading
Moralejo, Eduardo, J. A. García‐Muñoz, and Enric Descals. "Susceptibility of Iberian trees to Phytophthora ramorum and P. cinnamomi." Plant pathology58.2 (2009): 271–283.
Hong, C. X., et al. "Phytophthora hydropathica, a new pathogen identified from irrigation water, Rhododendron catawbiense and Kalmia latifolia." Plant pathology 59.5 (2010): 913–921.
Érsek, T., and O. Ribeiro. "Mini review article: an annotated list of new Phytophthora species described post 1996." Acta Phytopathologica et Entomologica Hungarica 45.2 (2010): 251–266.

polonica
Water mould plant pathogens and diseases
Tree diseases
Protists described in 2006